The 1902 St. Louis Cardinals season was the team's 21st season in St. Louis, Missouri and its 11th season in the National League. The Cardinals went 56–78 during the season and finished 6th in the National League.

Regular season 
Due to the loss of Bobby Wallace and Jesse Burkett to the St. Louis Browns, the Cardinals went from a team with 76 wins and 64 losses in 1901 to a team that finished 1902 with 56 wins and 78 defeats.

Season standings

Record vs. opponents

Roster

Player stats

Batting

Starters by position 
Note: Pos = Position; G = Games played; AB = At bats; H = Hits; Avg. = Batting average; HR = Home runs; RBI = Runs batted in

Other batters 
Note: G = Games played; AB = At bats; H = Hits; Avg. = Batting average; HR = Home runs; RBI = Runs batted in

Pitching

Starting pitchers 
Note: G = Games pitched; IP = Innings pitched; W = Wins; L = Losses; ERA = Earned run average; SO = Strikeouts

Other pitchers 
Note: G = Games pitched; IP = Innings pitched; W = Wins; L = Losses; ERA = Earned run average; SO = Strikeouts

Relief pitchers 
Note: G = Games pitched; W = Wins; L = Losses; SV = Saves; ERA = Earned run average; SO = Strikeouts

References

External links 
1902 St. Louis Cardinals at Baseball Reference
1902 St. Louis Cardinals team page at www.baseball-almanac.com

St. Louis Cardinals seasons
Saint Louis Cardinals season
St Louis